George, Giorgi, (1250–1268) was the eldest son of David VII Ulu, a Bagratid king of Georgia, by whom he was designated as heir-apparent to the throne. In the early 1260s, he was held as a hostage at the Mongol Ilkhan court of Hulagu Khan and later served with his father in the Mongol military ranks. He died at the age of 18 in 1268, preceding his father by two years.

Biography
George was born in 1250 to King David VII and the Alan woman Altun, whom the king took as a temporary wife because he had no children by his queen Jigda-Khatun and whom he agreed to dismiss after the birth of an heir. The marriage was, in fact, repudiated after the birth of the second child, a daughter, Tamar. George was adopted by Jigda-Khatun, who died shortly afterwards. George, along with his father, step-mother, and the uncle David VI Narin, is mentioned in a church inscription from Abelia in the south of Georgia. 
  
In 1262, David's rebellion against the Ilkhan hegemony ended in failure and he had to agree to peace terms offered by Hulagu Khan, envisaging, among other things, sending George as a hostage to the Ilkhan court. David acceded and the boy-prince George, under protection of the Christian man called Enuk Arkun, traveled to the khan's court in Iran, where he was treated with honor. At one point, when the peace between Hulagu and David was about to collapse, the khan contemplated to put George to death, but the prince's life was saved through the intervention of Hulagu's Christian wife Doquz Khatun. Within a year or so, George was allowed to return to Georgia, where he joined his father in the exhausting service along the defensive lines in Shirvan, which had been erected by Hulagu against the rival Mongol khan Berke. It was where George contracted a severe bowel disease, which eventually took his life in 1268. His body was briefly rested at the Sioni cathedral in Tbilisi and then buried at Mtskheta. The sorrowful king David VII died within two years, leaving his troubled kingdom to Demetrius, a younger son of his third marriage to Queen Gvantsa.

Ancestry

Notes

References

1250 births
1268 deaths
Bagrationi dynasty of the Kingdom of Georgia
Georgian princes
13th-century people from Georgia (country)
Heirs apparent who never acceded